Nicklaus Scott Snyder (born October 10, 1995) is an American professional baseball pitcher in the Texas Rangers organization. He made his Major League Baseball (MLB) debut in 2021.

Amateur career
Snyder attended South Fork High School in Stuart, Florida. Undrafted out of high school, Snyder attended Indian River State College in Fort Pierce, Florida. Snyder was an infielder throughout his college baseball career, and was named the Florida NJCAA Defensive Player of the year in 2017. Snyder was drafted by the Texas Rangers in the 19th round of the 2017 MLB draft, as a pitcher.

Professional career
Snyder made his professional debut with the AZL Rangers of the Rookie-level Arizona League in 2017, posting a 1.29 ERA over 7 innings. He returned to the AZL in 2018, going 1–0 with a 6.00 ERA and 12 strikeouts over 12 innings. Snyder spent the 2019 season with the Hickory Crawdads of the Class A South Atlantic League, posting a 5–3 record with a 3.06 ERA and 60 strikeouts over 53 innings. Following the 2019 season, he played for the Surprise Saguaros of the Arizona Fall League. Snyder underwent Tommy John surgery in February 2020, but did not miss game action that year due to the cancellation of the Minor League Baseball season because of the COVID-19 pandemic. Snyder opened the 2021 season with the Hickory Crawdads of the High-A East league, posting a 2.17 ERA with 17 strikeouts over  innings, before being promoted to the Frisco RoughRiders of the Double-A Central league on June 17. After posting a 1.65 ERA with 25 strikeouts over  innings, Snyder was promoted to the Round Rock Express of the Triple-A West league. With Round Rock, he posted a 6.23 ERA over five appearances. On August 20, Texas selected his contact to the active roster and promoted him to the major leagues for the first time. He made his major league debut on August 21 versus the Boston Red Sox; throwing a scoreless inning in relief and recording his first MLB strikeout (J. D. Martinez). Snyder made four appearances for Texas in 2021, before being shut down with right shoulder fatigue in September. Snyder was named the Rangers' 2021 minor league Reliever of the Year. He was non tendered and became a free agent on November 18, 2022. He re-signed with Texas on December 9, 2022 on a minor league contract.

References

External links

Indian River Pioneers bio

1995 births
Living people
People from Palm City, Florida
People from Stuart, Florida
Baseball players from Florida
Major League Baseball pitchers
Texas Rangers players
Indian River State Pioneers baseball players
Arizona League Rangers players
Hickory Crawdads players
Surprise Saguaros players
Frisco RoughRiders players
Round Rock Express players